Ralph Warren King (November 2, 1901February 8, 1978) was an American football player.  He played two seasons in the National Football League (NFL) as a guard for the Racine Legion (1924) and Chicago Bears (1925). He was selected as the third-team guard on the 1924 All-Pro Team.

References

1901 births
1978 deaths
Players of American football from Chicago
American football guards
Chicago Maroons football players
Racine Legion players
Chicago Bears players